Atlantic Community School District (ACSD) is a public school district headquartered in Atlantic, Iowa. The district is mostly in Cass County and also occupies parts of Audubon and Pottawattamie counties. The district serves Atlantic and Marne.

History

Michael Amstein served as the superintendent from April 2010 until 2016, when he retired. Steve Barber, formerly of the George–Little Rock Community School District, became the new superintendent at that time.

Schools

All schools are in Atlantic:
 Atlantic High School (9–12)
 Atlantic Middle School (6–8)
 Washington Elementary School (PK–3)
 Schuler Elementary School (4–5)
 Early Learning Center

See also
List of school districts in Iowa

References

External links
 Atlantic Community School District
 
School districts in Iowa
Education in Audubon County, Iowa
Education in Cass County, Iowa
Education in Pottawattamie County, Iowa